The Chicago Board Options Exchange (CBOE), located at 433 West Van Buren Street in Chicago, is the largest U.S. options exchange with an annual trading volume of around 1.27 billion at the end of 2014. CBOE offers options on over 2,200 companies, 22 stock indices, and 140 exchange-traded funds (ETFs).

The Chicago Board of Trade established the Chicago Board Options Exchange in 1973. The first exchange to list standardized, exchange-traded stock options began its first day of trading on April 26, 1973, in celebration of the 125th birthday of the Chicago Board of Trade. The CBOE is regulated by the Securities and Exchange Commission and owned by Cboe Global Markets.

Contracts offered
Cboe (and other national options exchanges) offers options on the following, and others:

Cboe calculates and disseminates the CBOE Volatility Index (VIX), the CBOE S&P 500 BuyWrite Index (BXM), and other indices.

See also 
 Chicago Board of Trade Building	
 Commodity Futures Trading Commission	
 Derivatives market	
 List of futures exchanges	
 National Stock Exchange (Jersey City, New Jersey)
 OneChicago
 Options Clearing Corporation
 Volatility Index

References

External links
 Cboe

Financial services companies established in 1973
1973 establishments in Illinois
Companies based in Chicago
Economy of Chicago
Stock exchanges in the United States
Options exchanges in the United States
Options (finance)